Coptis chinensis, the Chinese goldthread, is a species of goldthread flowering plant native to China.

Etymology
Coptis chinensis Franch. var. chinensis
(syn. Coptis teeta Wallich var. chinensis)

Chemical constituents
The rhizomes of Coptis chinensis contain the isoquinoline alkaloids berberine, palmatine, and coptisine among others.

Traditional uses
Coptis chinensis is one of the 50 fundamental herbs used in traditional Chinese medicine, where it is called duǎn è huánglián. It has been proved to have anti‐cancer, anti‐inflammatory, and anti‐bacterial properties and to help to improve cardiovascular conditions.

Other uses
Because of the strong coloring quality of berberine, it has been traditionally used as a dye, especially for wool and other fibers.

References

External links
WHO Monographs on Selected Medicinal Plants

chinensis
Plants used in traditional Chinese medicine
Taxa named by Adrien René Franchet
Plants described in 1897